

Erich Schopper (2 July 1892 – 18 August 1978) was a German general in the Wehrmacht during World War II. He was a recipient of the Knight's Cross of the Iron Cross of Nazi Germany.

Awards
 Knight's Cross of the Iron Cross on 30 April 1943 as Generalleutnant and commander of 81. Infanterie-Division

References

Citations

Bibliography

 

1892 births
1978 deaths
People from Zeulenroda-Triebes
People from the Principality of Reuss-Greiz
Lieutenant generals of the German Army (Wehrmacht)
German Army personnel of World War I
Recipients of the clasp to the Iron Cross, 1st class
Recipients of the Gold German Cross
Recipients of the Knight's Cross of the Iron Cross
Prussian Army personnel
Reichswehr personnel
German Army generals of World War II
Military personnel from Thuringia